Noam Cohen (born 6 January 1999) is an Israeli footballer who plays as a defender for Ironi Kiryat Shmona.

Career

CLub career

Cohen started his career with Israeli top flight side Maccabi Tel Aviv. In 2018, he was sent on loan to Beitar Tel Aviv Bat Yam in the Israeli second tier. In 2019, Cohen was sent on loan to Israeli top flight club Sektzia Ness Ziona, where he made 22 league appearances and scored 0 goals. On 31 August 2019, he debuted for Sektzia Ness Ziona during a 0–3 loss to Maccabi Netanya.

International career

Cohen is eligible to represent Luxembourg internationally through his grandparents.

References

External links
 

1999 births
Living people
Israeli footballers
Luxembourgian footballers
Maccabi Tel Aviv F.C. players
Beitar Tel Aviv Bat Yam F.C. players
Sektzia Ness Ziona F.C. players
Hapoel Hadera F.C. players
Hapoel Haifa F.C. players
Hapoel Ironi Kiryat Shmona F.C. players
Liga Leumit players
Israeli Premier League players
Footballers from Shoham
Association football defenders